Russia-1 is a state-owned Russian television channel, first aired on 14 February 1956 as Programme Two in the Soviet Union. It was relaunched as RTR on 13 May 1991, and is known today as Russia-1. It is the flagship channel of the All-Russia State Television and Radio Company (VGTRK).

In 2008 Russia-1 had the second largest audience in Russian television. In a typical week, it was viewed by 75% of urban Russians, compared to 83% for the leading channel, Channel One. The two channels are similar in their politics, and they compete directly in entertainment. Russia-1 has many regional variations and broadcasts in many languages.

History

Soviet period
Russia-1 started broadcasting as The Second Moscow Programme (Programme Two) in 1956. From the very start, it only hosted programs produced by the Ministry of Education of the Soviet Union, as well as children's programming, in monochrome. The move to a new channel frequency resulted in it being renamed Program 2 and becoming the second home of the national newscast Vremya since 1968.

Program 2 officially renamed itself  All-Union Program 2 in 1972 and converted to color in 1975, and two years later became a nationwide station, being broadcast all over the Soviet Union. On January 1, 1982 AUP2 officially began to broadcast, not just educational and children's programming but also culture and arts programming and sports, as it was officially permitted to take greater account of the needs and tastes of spectators in a changing era. In addition, it broadcast also documentaries, music videos and programming, and movies.

Starting New Year's Day 1984, All Union Program 2 was renamed All-Union Channel 2 (AUC2), and it pioneered the first ever rhythmic gymnastics broadcast the following year. By 1987, it was also the first channel to adopt sign language interpretation in the USSR and later supplemented by subtitles for the hard of hearing, all for its Vremya broadcast.

The official identification package for the channel was the star of the second antenna on a blue background with moving rings, symbolizing the radio waves, and the signature at the bottom of "II program", which then changed to "TV USSR." Around February 1988, a new ident replaced it: circles were fixed, disappeared inscription "TV USSR", and the background was light blue with a white gradient.

Since 1989, the Russian Soviet Federative Socialist Republic (RSFSR) implemented the organization of the Russian national TV channel. By this time all the Union republics, with the exception of Russia, had their own TV channels. In 1990, the creator of the program "The Fifth Wheel", People's Deputy of the Supreme Soviet of the RSFSR Bella Kurkova requested the Chairman of the Supreme Soviet of Russia, Boris Yeltsin to create a separate Russian television station for the RSFSR, due to the fact that the central television channels reflect the views of the federal authorities. At that time, the country experienced a confrontation between the union and republican authorities.

On July 13, 1990 a decision of the Supreme Soviet of Russia ended the national monopoly on radio and television broadcasting in the RSFSR, clearing the way for it to launch its own TV and radio stations. Prior to September 15, 1990, according to the decree, the Cabinet of Ministers of the RSFSR, Supreme Soviet of the RSFSR, and the CM Committee on the media, communications with public organizations, mass movements of citizens and public opinion research should address the issue of the ownership of the material-technical base of AUC2. On July 14, 1990 decree № 107-1 of the Presidium of the Supreme Soviet of the RSFSR officially established the All-Russia State Television and Radio Broadcasting Company. Chairman of the Council of Ministers of the RSFSR Ivan Silaev helped acquire the building and the equipment for the future station.

Thus, Russia-1 is the successor to the Soviet Second Programme launched in 1956.

Russian Federation
After 27 years, the All-Union State Television and Radio Broadcasting Company turned over the operations of AUC2 on March 6, 1991 to the All-Russian State Television and Radio Broadcasting Company, with Oleg Poptsov as its founding chairman. At the same time, the leadership of the company had been promised at least a 6-hour broadcast day as a national blocktimer for viewers within Russia, including a brand-new 20-minute newscast to be aired twice daily on the new channel. Due to the opposition views of the Republican team, the new management staff, led by the new GM for the soon to be re-branded Russian Television, Sergei Podgorbunsky, faced difficulties ranging from an inability to rent a studio in the telecentre "Ostankino" to failure to provide the promised before air time for new programs.

At the same time, there were problems with the recruitment of new employees, program presenters and staff for the new station. Many presenters left the Union STRC free from TV censorship. As a result, the station management started to brainstorm and conceptualize its programming from scratch, including news and current affairs. Thus, "Vesti", the news program of RTV, was born, with airing time being at 18:00 and 20:00, twice nightly on weekdays (The 2nd edition was to be aired before its simulcast of Vremya). Most of the staff of "Vesti" on "Russian Television" were former presenters and staff of Central Television program "Television News Service", their experience would help the new channel in its news services. Four studios - "News" for newscasts, "Republic" for current affairs, "Lad" for arts and culture and "Artel" for entertainment and lifestyle were created.

On May 13, 1991 recently appointed to the post of deputy general manager of the State Television and Radio Valentin Lazutkin officially launched the brand new ARSTV Channel 2 with air times from 11.35 to 13.35, from 17.00 to 19.00 and from 21.45 to 23.45, weekdays and weekends, with AUC2 filling the rest of the schedule. It was given a new corporate logo and a new brand name: "Russian Television".

At 17.00 "Vesti" made its premiere telecast, with Svetlana Sorokina hosting. From this time on Russian Television aired programming not only from the All-Union State Television and Radio but also from the All-Russian State Television and Radio Broadcasting Company. Compared with "Vremya", "Vesti" became the acute, short, specific and operational newscast Russians watched, without any censorship or bias. In the first week of broadcasting, "Good Night, Little Ones!" (beginning in 2002) And Odessa "" made their premiere telecasts. Two weeks later, "RTR" ("Russian Television and Radio") became the new name of the channel, and a new logo debuted.

In August 1991, RTR stopped broadcasting in Latvia and was replaced by LTV2 (now LTV7).

During the August coup, on August 19, 1991 the Emergency Committee stopped the broadcast of RTR, and AUC2 officially returned in the evening slots, with its planned programs including the great ballet "Swan Lake". Unknown to the coup leaders, RTR secretly organized a broadcast to the United States and other countries, as well as all over the USSR, so that all Soviets saw a special edition of "Vesti" with the latest events in Moscow during the coup. Studio "Vesti" in the "Ostankino" Center was blocked by AUC2 management, the transfer was recorded on video tape to "Shabolovke" for emergency situations has been prepared by an OB van and outside mobile facilities that the young channel had. The Emergency Committee blocked RTR headquarters on Yamskov field. In less than a few days, RTR had Clandestine broadcasts nationwide till the coup had failed.  After the August Coup "RTR" by order of Valentin Lazutkin, its deputy GM for operations, officially resumed broadcasting this time from 19.00 to 00.00 (instead of 17.00 to 19.00 and 21.45 to 23.45).

On September 16, 1991 AUC2 ended its operations and RTR absorbed several of its staff and programs, therefore beginning the next day it began to broadcast from the very morning till late at midnight.  On 30 December 1991 the program "Vesti" began to appear three times a day, and from 20 January 1992 to four times a day. In 1993, the channel changed its logo 2 times.

In February 1992, utilizing the frequencies of RTR in Ukraine, channel UT-2 (now 1 +1) was launched.

During the political crisis of 1993 RTR aired interviews from the different sides of the spectrum, from politicians to ordinary people. During the shooting of the White House, the director of the channel had violated the order to conduct the bombing broadcast live on that point, as long as the line of fire to avoid civilian casualties among the citizens of Moscow. After the police pushed the townspeople, "RTR" started broadcasting "CNN". At that time the building was shelled, which housed the studio of "Vesti". In a hole punched in the building of a grenade launcher, armed men broke into the studios and began shelling the building on fire.

The director of the program "Vesti" Irina Vinogradova was able to save the footage. Technical Director Stanislav Bunevich able to carry TV broadcasts control of the country in building the All-Russian STRC on Yamskov field. Broadcasting channel was restored, "RTR" was the only television channel, remaining on the air and which showed the 1993 First Deputy Prime Minister of Russia Vladimir Shumeyko "Vesti" were donated to the mantel clock. events. Broadcasting was done in a hurry equipped studio in the basement with the lights off. Later, in a building opposite were found maturation snipers. For coverage of

Showing important events, "Vesti" become the most influential program on RTR.  In the same year, Yuri Rostov, Vladislav Flyarkovsky and Aleksandr Gurnov started their jobs as field reporters for the channel under then head of news programming Alexander Nekhoroshev.

Since 1994, the program began to leave a comment, "Details", which became a leading political commentator Nikolai Svanidze news. In October 1995, the RTR with ORT program went "Ivanov, Petrov, Sidorov."

In 1996 Oleg Poptsov, Anatoly Lysenko, Alexander and Alexander Podgorbunsky Nekhoroshev were relieved of their posts, and Details was pulled off. The new chairman of the All-Russia State Television and Radio Company Eduard Sagalaev was appointed, and Cyril Legat chosen as the new GM for television, editor in chief of information programs of Russian Television Boris Forgetful. The channel will have emerged a number of new programs - information-analytical program "Mirror", which became a leading Nikolai Svanidze, the actual interview "VIP", talk show "Open News", which became the leading Edward Sagalaev, Svetlana Sorokina and  a manufacturer of private television ATV.

In 1997, the chairman of the All-Russia State Television and Radio Company was Nikolai Svanidze. Programs "VIP" and "Open News" were closed, she was dismissed leading "Vesti" Svetlana Sorokina. On November of that year, "RTR" changed to "RTR-1" has changed the logo. The reason for the name change - the creation of a new TV channel "RTR-2" (now "Russia-Culture").

On May 8, 1998 in the RTR includes regional television and radio. Since then, "RTR" broadcasts in 54 languages of the peoples of Russia, RTR became the largest media group in Europe. The general is not only the design of the channel, but the editorial policy. On 7 September of that year, on the air for the first time block out the morning program .

September 14, 1998 "RTR-1" again changed its name to "RTR", changed the logo. At that time there were many Latin American television series production and a lot of new TV shows: , Schedule, Purple haze, and Hakuna matata. The show Hundred to One also joined the channel, thus leaving TVC-Moskva.

In 1999, the channel was disbanded edition sports "Arena" and instead was established sports studio, headed by Vladimir Gomelsky.  The daily "Vesti" began to be broadcast at 13:00, 17:00, 19:00, 21:00, 23:00.

Up to 1999, the national channel was plagued by broadcasting problems resulting from its dependence on its local state affiliates (GTRKs) for retransmission of its signal. GTRKs had no incentive to consistently broadcast only federal programming on their local frequencies and would often mix in programming they had produced themselves or acquired from other sources, thus hampering the national channel’s ability to control its own programming schedule at the regional level. The first step leading to the solution of this problem was the creation of the state holding company VGTRK, which united 89 state-owned regional studios under the aegis of the Moscow-based Channel 2. In February 2004, the Russian government issued a resolution on the reorganization of VGTRK through affiliation of subsidiaries, including regional GTRK companies. By the end of 2004, the scale of the reorganization became obvious. Local news programmes were organized on network principles and local companies turned into "re-transmitters" of the Moscow-produced content: VGTRK management had decided to cut all types of broadcasting in the regions, except news. This decision caused an inevitable reduction of GTRK broadcasting volume from 900 - 1,200 to 590 hours, the closure of whole subdivisions and departments and the dismissal of hundreds of employees in each of the 89 companies.

Viewership

According to Mediascope, by 2020, Russia-1 was the most popular TV channel in Russia with an average daily audience of 1,338,000, exceeding the audience of its closest rival Channel One Russia by almost 9%.

Criticism
On 23 May 2015, Russia-1 aired Warsaw Pact: Declassified Pages, a documentary that presented the 1968 invasion of Czechoslovakia as protection against a NATO coup. Slovakia's Ministry of Foreign Affairs stated that the film "attempts to rewrite history and to falsify historical truths about such a dark chapter of our history." Czech Foreign Minister Lubomír Zaorálek said that it "grossly distorts" the facts.

The channel, like many other state-owned television channels, has been criticized for strong pro-government bias and propaganda. In 2017, Dmitry Skorobutov, a long-term editor at the channel, published a periodically-updated guide for journalists that contains a list of topics, the coverage of which is forbidden. It included topics such as anti-government protests, the downing of MH17 over Donbas, Nadia Savchenko, Crimean Tatars, and even Queen Elizabeth II's anniversary.

In June 2017, researchers of Atlantic Council published a detailed analysis of one fake story propagated by Russia-1, about a Russian warplane deploying an electronic warfare system so powerful that it was able to completely disable defence systems of US Navy destroyer. The original story was traced to a satirical piece written by a Russian author Dmitry Sedov, in a form of a panicked letter from American navy sailor to his wife. The story was then picked up by Russia-1 as a description of a real incident and aired with a made-up video demonstrating the advantages of Russian weapons. In spite of the Russian weapon manufacturer denying the report and calling it "a fake", Russian media continued to repeated the story, adding further invented details such as fake statement from a former United States Air Force commander in Europe.

The channel's news programming has been noted for the frequency with which its presenters propose Russian nuclear attack on Western countries, including the United Kingdom and United States of America.

Logos

References

Further reading

External links

  
 VGTRK official website 
 VGTRK sales department 
 Fan website 

 
Mass media companies of Russia
Television channels in Russia
Television channels and stations established in 1991
Russian-language television stations
1991 establishments in Russia
Companies based in Moscow
Television channels and stations established in 1956
1956 establishments in Russia